Sougb, or Sogh, is a Papuan language of the East Bird's Head language family spoken in the east of the Bird's Head Peninsula to the east of Meyah and to the south of Manokwari, including the area of Soug Jaya District, Teluk Wondama Regency. It consists of four dialects and is spoken by around 12,000 people in all. The language is alternatively known as Mantion,  or Manikion, an originally derogatory term used by the Biak people.

Distribution
Locations:

Pegunungan Arfak Regency
Anggi District
Manokwari Regency
Manokwari Barat District (in Ayambori village) and Warmare District
Manokwari Selatan Regency
Dataran Isim District: Tubes and Duhugesa villages
Manokwari Selatan Regency (Bohon dialect)
Tahota District: Seimeba village
Teluk Bintuni Regency (Raw dialect)
Manimeri District: Atibo, Pasamai, and Botai villages
Bintuni District: Bintuni village
Teluk Wondama Regency (Wepu dialect)
Sougb Jaya District: Kaprus, Siresi, Yarmatum, Reyob, and Nuspairo villages
Rumberpon District: Iseren and Watitindau villages

References

External links 
 Materials on Sougb are included in the open access Arthur Capell (AC1) and Bert Voorhoeve (CLV1) collections held by Paradisec.

Languages of western New Guinea
Mantion–Meax languages